The 1937 NFL Championship Game was the fifth championship game of the National Football League (NFL), held December 12 at Wrigley Field in Chicago with an attendance of 15,878. The game featured the Western Division champions Chicago Bears (9–1–1) and the Eastern Division champions Washington Redskins (8–3).

Background
Prior to the 1937 season, Redskins owner George Preston Marshall moved the team from Boston to his hometown of Washington, D.C. The Boston Redskins won the Eastern Division title the previous season, but  attendances were very poor in Boston, which forced Marshall to move the 1936 NFL Championship Game from Fenway Park to the Polo Grounds in New York City. The Redskins selected quarterback Sammy Baugh from TCU in the first round of the 1937 NFL draft, and the rookie led the league in passing with a then-record 81 pass completions, and Redskins halfback Cliff Battles led the NFL in rushing with 874 yards.

The Bears had a nine-win season under head coach George Halas, the last for Bears great Bronko Nagurski (other than a brief, one-year return to the Bears in 1943).

Baugh stated that the field conditions were, in his words "the worst field I ever saw. The field had been torn up the previous week, and it froze solid with jagged clods sticking up. I've never seen so many people get cut up in a football game."

Learning from the "Sneakers" game of 1934, both teams were prepared with a supply of basketball shoes in case of slippery field conditions.

Game summary
The Redskins scored first when Baugh led the team down to the Chicago 7-yard line, where he slipped the ball to Battles on a reverse for the game's first touchdown.

The Bears came back, however, as halfback Jack Manders scored the next fourteen points for the Bears: a touchdown run, a touchdown pass reception, and two extra points. Chicago led 14–7 at halftime.

Baugh took over in the second half, mixing short and long passes, shredding the Bears defense. (Baugh would finish the game 18-for-33 passing, for 335 yards; he had led the league in 1937 with an average of 102.5 yards passing per game.) Even using five defensive linemen (most teams used six at the time) and a sixth defensive back, the Bears could not stop the Redskins passing attack.

In the fourth quarter, the score was tied 21–21, before Baugh threw a 35-yard touchdown strike to Redskins wingback Ed Justice to take the lead for good, 28–21.

The First Fifty Years, a 1969 book that chronicles the first half-century of the NFL, listed the game as the second of "Ten [Games] That Mattered." "In his rookie year," the book concludes, "Sammy Baugh had beaten pro football's best with a style of play 15 years before its time. And in his first year in prestigious Washington, George Preston Marshall ran up a championship flag. Pro football was getting its base."

Scoring summary
Sunday, December 12, 1937Kickoff: 1:15 p.m. CST

 First quarter
 WAS – Cliff Battles 7-yard run (Riley Smith kick), 7–0 WAS
 CHI   – Jack Manders 10-yard run (Manders kick), 7–7 tie
 Second quarter
 CHI   – Manders 37-yard pass from Bernard Masterson (Manders kick), 14–7 CHI
 Third quarter
 WAS – Wayne Millner 55-yard pass from Sammy Baugh (Smith kick), 14–14 tie
 CHI   – Edgar Manske 4-yard pass from Masterson (Manders kick), 21–14 CHI
 Fourth quarter
 WAS – Millner 78-yard pass from Baugh (Smith kick), 21–21 tie
 WAS – Ed Justice 35-yard pass from Baugh (Smith kick), 28–21 WAS

Source:

Players' shares
An expected attendance of 40,000 was not reached due to the week's poor weather, which kept it under 16,000. Each player on the winning Redskins team received $225, while the Bears received $127 each.

Officials
Referee: Bill Halloran
Umpire: Ed Cochrane
Head Linesman: Bobby Cahn
Field Judge: Tommy Hughitt

References

Chicago Bears postseason
Washington Redskins postseason
1937 NFL Championship Game
Championship
NFL Championship
December 1937 sports events